Mohammed Al-Qarni is a Saudi Arabian football player.

External links
slstat.com Profile

1981 births
Living people
Saudi Arabian footballers
Al-Shoulla FC players
Al-Faisaly FC players
Al-Diriyah Club players
Al-Kawkab FC players
Saudi First Division League players
Saudi Professional League players
Saudi Second Division players
Association football midfielders